Mashino is a village in Krasnokholmsky District of Tver Oblast, Russia.

References

Rural localities in Krasnokholmsky District